The Master Man is a 1919 silent film drama directed by Ernest C. Warde and produced by and starring Frank Keenan. It was distributed by Pathé Exchange films.

Cast
Frank Keenan - Emanuel Blake
Kathleen Kirkham - Janice Ritter
Joseph J. Dowling - George R. Vanter
Joseph McManus - Mitchell Murray
Jack Brammall - McCullough Davenport
William V. Mong - Sebastian Ritter
Hardee Kirkland - Gov. Wheeler
J. Barney Sherry - Lt. Governor
Joe Ray - Purdy Cavanaugh

Preservation status
An incomplete print of the film survives in the BFI National Film and Television Archive.

References

External links
The Master Man at IMDb.com

1919 films
American silent feature films
American black-and-white films
Silent American drama films
Pathé Exchange films
Incomplete film lists
1919 drama films
Films directed by Ernest C. Warde
1910s American films